is a Japanese former professional footballer who played as a forward. He made over 50 appearances for the Japanese national team and he played professionally for two decades in Japan, Brazil, Belgium, Serbia and the United States.

Club career
Suzuki has spent the majority of his playing career with Kashima Antlers, playing six stints for the team over the course of ten years, in between short periods playing in Brazil and Belgium. Suzuki played 87 games in the J1 League for Kashima, scoring 17 goals, and helping the team win the J1 Championship in 1996, 1998, 2000 and 2001.

Takayuki Suzuki had not scored for 1790 minutes/46 games consecutive, until he scored a goal against RSC Anderlecht in September 2003.

On 28 January 2006, Suzuki signed with Red Star Belgrade during the 2005–06 season winter break at the period Toyota was the main sponsor of the club. However, Suzuki's time in Serbia was a disappointment and his move back to J1 League to join Yokohama F. Marinos was announced on 19 January 2007.

On 28 March 2008, it was revealed that he signed a one-year contract with Portland Timbers of the USL First Division, joining on a free transfer.

On 8 June 2011, Suzuki agreed to join J2 League side Mito HollyHock. With the club and city in financial difficult following the 2011 Tōhoku earthquake and tsunami, he promised to play for free in the 2011 season.

After one season with JEF United Chiba, he announced his retirement from football at the age of 39.

International career
Suzuki made his international debut for Japan national team in 2001, and scored his first international goal on 2 June 2001, in a 2001 Confederations Cup game against Cameroon.

He played all four of Japan's games at the 2002 World Cup on home soil, starting the first three and scoring in the 2–2 tie against Belgium; Japan were eliminated in the round of 16 following a 1–0 defeat to Turkey.

He was also part of the Japanese team which won the 2004 Asian Cup. He played 55 games and scored 11 goals for Japan until 2005.

Career statistics

Club

International

Honors
Kashima Antlers
J1 League: 1996, 1998, 2000, 2001

Genk
Belgian Supercup runner-up: 2002

Red Star Belgrade
Serbian Superliga: 2005–06, 2006–07
Serbian Cup: 2006–07

Portland Timbers
USL First Division Commissioner's Cup: 2009

Japan
FIFA Confederations Cup runner-up: 2001
FIFA Confederations Cup Silver Shoe: 2001
AFC Asian Cup: 2004

Trivia
 Takayuki Suzuki is featured on the 2001 PlayStation 2 game cover "Jikkyou J-League Perfect Striker 4" together with Shunsuke Nakamura and Atsuhiro Miura

References

External links
 
 
 Japan National Football Team Database
 
 Portland Timbers bio
 Suzuki's USL Goal of the Week from 4/26/08 at YouTube

1976 births
Living people
AFC Asian Cup-winning players
Japanese footballers
Association football people from Ibaraki Prefecture
Association football forwards
Japan international footballers
Belgian Pro League players
J1 League players
J2 League players
Serbian SuperLiga players
USL First Division players
USSF Division 2 Professional League players
JEF United Chiba players
Kashima Antlers players
Kawasaki Frontale players
K.R.C. Genk players
Mito HollyHock players
Portland Timbers (2001–2010) players
Red Star Belgrade footballers
Yokohama F. Marinos players
2001 FIFA Confederations Cup players
2002 FIFA World Cup players
2004 AFC Asian Cup players
2005 FIFA Confederations Cup players
Japanese expatriate footballers
Japanese expatriate sportspeople in Belgium
Expatriate footballers in Belgium
Japanese expatriate sportspeople in Brazil
Expatriate footballers in Brazil
Japanese expatriate sportspeople in Serbia
Expatriate footballers in Serbia
Expatriate footballers in Serbia and Montenegro
Japanese expatriate sportspeople in the United States
Expatriate soccer players in the United States